Lua de Cristal (Spanish: Luna de Cristal; English: Crystal Moon) is a song by Brazilian singer Xuxa. It was released on July 16, 1990, by Som Livre along with his seventh studio album. Written by Michael Sullivan and Paulo Massadas, Luna de Cristal is the theme song from the 1990 Tizuka Yamasaki film of the same name starring Xuxa.

In addition, the song achieved international success, when it was released outside Brazil in 1991, reaching position #35 on the Billboard's Hot Latin Songs chart.

Charts

References

Brazilian songs
Children's songs
1990 singles
1990 songs
Xuxa songs
Number-one singles in Brazil
Songs about the Moon